Salem Mohammed Shafi Al-Dawsari (born 19 August 1991) is a Saudi Arabian professional footballer who plays as a winger for Saudi Professional League club Al Hilal and the Saudi Arabia national team.

Club career
Al-Dawsari joined Al Hilal as a youth player. In 2018, as part of a deal between the Saudi Arabian Football Federation and La Liga, he joined Spanish club Villarreal on loan. He made one appearance in Spain, coming on as a substitute against Real Madrid as Villareal came from behind to draw 2–2.

In the second leg of the 2019 AFC Champions League Final on 24 November, Al-Dawsari scored the opening goal in an eventual 2–0 away win over Urawa Red Diamonds, which saw Al-Hilal win the title following a 3–0 aggregate victory; the title allowed them to qualify for the 2019 FIFA Club World Cup.

On 7 February 2023, Al-Dawsari scored two penalties in a 3–2 win over Flamengo in the 2022 FIFA Club World Cup semi-final, in which his club reached the final for the first time in their history.

International career
Al-Dawsari was called up to the Saudi Arabia national team for the 2014 FIFA World Cup qualifiers, and scored his first international goal in an away match against Australia in 2012. In May 2018, he was named in Saudi Arabia's preliminary squad for the 2018 FIFA World Cup in Russia. On 25 June, Al-Dawsari scored a late winning goal as his side won 2–1 over Egypt in their last group stage match of the World Cup.

On 22 November 2022, Al-Dawsari scored his second goal at a FIFA World Cup, his first at the 2022 edition in Qatar, in a match against Argentina. He made a run around the box before finishing past Emiliano Martínez to put Saudi Arabia ahead by a score of 2–1, which ended in a historic shock victory for the Green Falcons. On 30 November, he scored a goal against Mexico, in which he equaled the record of most goals scored by a Saudi player in World Cups, three goals by Sami Al-Jaber, as Saudi Arabia exited the World Cup with a 2–1 loss to Mexico.

Career statistics

Club

International
Statistics accurate as of match played 30 November 2022.

Scores and results list Saudi Arabia's goal tally first (one unofficial goal included).

Honours

Al-Hilal
 Saudi Professional League: 2016–17, 2019–20, 2020–21, 2021–22
 King's Cup: 2015, 2017, 2019–20
 Crown Prince Cup: 2011–12, 2012–13, 2015–16
 Saudi Super Cup: 2015, 2018, 2021
 AFC Champions League: 2019, 2021

Individual
IFFHS AFC Man Team of the Year: 2020
IFFHS AFC Men's Team of the Decade 2011–2020
AFC Champions League MVP: 2021

References

External links

Goal.com profile 
Eurosport profile

1991 births
Living people
Sportspeople from Riyadh
Saudi Arabian footballers
Association football wingers
Saudi Professional League players
La Liga players
Al Hilal SFC players
Villarreal CF players
2015 AFC Asian Cup players
2019 AFC Asian Cup players
Saudi Arabia youth international footballers
Saudi Arabia international footballers
Saudi Arabian expatriate footballers
Saudi Arabian expatriate sportspeople in Spain
Expatriate footballers in Spain
2018 FIFA World Cup players
Olympic footballers of Saudi Arabia
Footballers at the 2020 Summer Olympics
2022 FIFA World Cup players